The Bot are a Hindu caste found in the state of Uttar Pradesh in India. They are distinct from the Bhotiya ethnic group of the Indian Terai, although like the Bhotiya claim a Nepali origin.

The community is said to have gotten its name from the fact that they are descended from the king of Botwal, a state that once existed in Nepal. They are said to have immigrated to what is now the Bahraich District of Uttar Pradesh in 1775. The community claim to Raghuvanshi Rajputs, a claim not accepted by neighbouring Rajput groups. They are a small community, found mainly in twenty villages of Jarwal (Harrajpur, Dusarapara, Sakhouta, Gour, Katka), Fakharpur, Kaiserganj, and Huzurpur blocks of Bahraich District. The community now speaks Awadhi, and have customs similar to neighbouring Hindu communities.

The Bot are strictly endogamous, but do not marry within the village. They occupy their own villages, very rarely sharing them with any other caste. Land is their main economic source, and they are community of cultivators. Of their main crops, they grow paddy and maize in the winter, and wheat and pulses in the summer. Each of their settlement contains an informal caste council, known as a biradari panchayat. These biradari panchayats are headed by chaudhary, the village headman. The panchayat acts as instrument of social control, dealing with issues such as divorce and adultery.

See also
 Tharu people

References

Social groups of Uttar Pradesh
Indian castes